Jacob "Jack" Kruschen (March 20, 1922 – April 2, 2002) was a Canadian character actor who worked primarily in American film, television and radio. Kruschen was nominated for the Academy Award for Best Supporting Actor for his role as Dr. Dreyfuss in the 1960 comedy-drama The Apartment.

Early life
Born in Winnipeg, Manitoba, as Jacob Kruschen, to Moses (aka Maurice and Morris) Kruschen and Sophie (née Bogushevsky) Kruschen, both of Russian Jewish descent, Kruschen and his family migrated to New York City in the early 1920s, and then to California. His sister, Miriam, was born in New York City in 1927. His acting in an operetta produced at Hollywood High School brought him to the attention of CBS.

Career

Radio
Kruschen began working at a radio station in Los Angeles when he was 16 and still in high school. During the 1940s, he became a staple of American West Coast radio drama. During World War II, he served in the Army, assigned to the Armed Forces Radio Service (AFRS). Following the war, he resumed working on network programs, including Broadway Is My Beat (as Mugovin, a detective), and Pete Kelly's Blues (as club owner George Lupo), as well as frequent episodic roles on anthology series, westerns and crime dramas.

He also performed on Escape, Dragnet, Gunsmoke (usually as law-abiding locals), Full House, Crime Classics, Frontier Gentleman, Yours Truly, Johnny Dollar, Nightbeat and Suspense.

Films

Kruschen received a nomination for the Academy Award for Best Supporting Actor for his performance as Dr. Dreyfuss in Billy Wilder's The Apartment.

Kruschen's film debut came in Red, Hot, and Blue. His other films included George Pal's The War of the Worlds (as Salvatore, one of the first three victims, a role he reprised on the Lux Radio Theater adaptation), in Cecil B. DeMille's final film, The Buccaneer, as astronaut Sam Jacobs in the 1959 cult classic The Angry Red Planet, The Unsinkable Molly Brown (as saloon owner Christmas Morgan), Abbott and Costello Go to Mars, Lover Come Back, McLintock! (with John Wayne and Maureen O'Hara), Follow That Dream (with Elvis Presley), Cape Fear, starring Gregory Peck and Robert Mitchum, and Money to Burn with Eve McVeagh.

Stage
Kruschen appeared as Maurice Pulvermacher in the original 1962 Broadway production of I Can Get It for You Wholesale. In 1969, he co-starred in the London staging of the musical drama Promises, Promises, reprising his film role in this show based on The Apartment.

Television
Kruschen was performing on television as early as 1939, appearing in dramas on Don Lee's experimental television station in Los Angeles, where he was seen on some two hundred television sets with three-inch screens. Thereafter, Kruschen's television career included guest villain Eivol Ekdol, a villainous magicians' craftsman on Batman (episodes 9 and 10). He was seen in twelve episodes of NBC's Dragnet (portraying a pedophile in one infamous episode) as well as the ABC/Desilu series, Zorro. He also appeared in a color episode of Adventures of Superman. He had a recurring role across three seasons on Bonanza (Italian grapegrower Giorgio Rossi). He also played Clyde Bailey in "The Retired Gun" (episode 17) and Sammy in "One Went to Denver" (episode 25).

In 1969, Kruschen co-starred with Stefanie Powers in an unsold ABC sitcom pilot, Holly Golighty, adapted from Truman Capote's Breakfast at Tiffany's. The husky, mustachioed Kruschen seemed to specialize in playing benevolent ethnic paternal figures. His roles included Sam Markowitz on Busting Loose, fireman Mike Woiski on Emergency!, Morris Sheinfeld on E/R, Tully on Hong Kong, and Jay Burrage on The Rifleman. He also appeared on Columbo (The Most Dangerous Match, 1973), Barney Miller, Odd Couple (TV series),  The Incredible Hulk, and, in later years, Murphy Brown, Lois and Clark: The New Adventures of Superman.

He appeared in the recurring role of "Grandpa Papadopolis" on Webster series (1985–87), and in the early 1990s, as another Greek grandfather and as Pam and Jesse's grandfather, Iorgos "Papouli" Katsopolis on Full House, appearing in only two episodes before his character is killed off in the episode, "The Last Dance".

His final on-screen appearance was in the 1997 film 'Til There Was You as "Mr. Katz".

Personal life and death
Kruschen was married to Marjorie Ullman from January 1947 to 1961, to Violet Rafaella Mooring from 1962 to 1978 (her death), and to Mary Pender from July 23, 1979, until his death.

Kruschen died on April 2, 2002, in Chandler, Arizona, while vacationing. He had been in ill health for some time. He was 80. Though he died on April 2, his death was not widely reported to the media until mid-late May.

Complete filmography

Red, Hot and Blue (1949) as Steve
Women from Headquarters (1950) as Sam
Where Danger Lives (1950) as Cosey – Ambulance Driver (uncredited)
No Way Out (1950) as Undetermined Minor Role (uncredited)
Gambling House (1950) as Burly Italian Immigrant (uncredited)
Cuban Fireball (1951) as Lefty
The Lemon Drop Kid (1951) as Muscleman (uncredited)
Comin' Round the Mountain (1951) as Gangster in Night Club
The People Against O'Hara (1951) as Detective (uncredited)
Meet Danny Wilson (1951) as Drunken Heckler (uncredited)
Confidence Girl (1952) as Detective Sergeant Quinn
Just Across the Street (1952) as Bit Part (uncredited)
Shadow in the Sky (1952) as Intern (uncredited)
The Miracle of Our Lady of Fatima (1952) as Sidonio (uncredited)
Tropical Heat Wave (1952) as Stickey Langley
The War of the Worlds (1953) as Salvatore
Abbott and Costello Go to Mars (1953) as Harry
Ma and Pa Kettle on Vacation (1953) as Jacques Amien (uncredited)
Fast Company (1953) as Doc – Poker Player (uncredited)
A Blueprint for Murder (1953) as Det.ective Lt. Harold Y. Cole
The Long, Long Trailer (1953) as Mechanic (uncredited)
Money from Home (1953) as Short Boy
The Great Diamond Robbery (1954) as Cafe Counterman (uncredited)
It Should Happen to You (1954) as Joe (uncredited)
Tennessee Champ (1954) as Andrews
Untamed Heiress (1954) as Louie
Prince of Players (1955) as Rabble-Rouser (uncredited)
Carolina Cannonball (1955) as Hogar
Dial Red O (1955) as Lloyd Lavalle
Soldier of Fortune (1955) as Austin Stoker
The Night Holds Terror (1955) as Detective Pope
The Benny Goodman Story (1956) as Murph Podolsky
The Steel Jungle (1956) as Truckdriver Helper
Outside the Law (1956) as Agent Phil Schwartz
Julie (1956) as Det. Mace
Badlands of Montana (1957) as Cavalry Sergeant
Reform School Girls (1957) as Mr. Horvath
Hear Me Good (1957) as Gaffer (uncredited)
Cry Terror! (1958) as F.B.I. Agent Charles Pope
Fräulein (1958) as Sgt. Grischa
The Decks Ran Red (1958) as Alex Cole
The Buccaneer (1958) as Hans
The Man Who Understood Women (1959) as Mickey (uncredited)
The Jayhawkers! (1959) as Cattleman (uncredited)
Beloved Infidel (1959) as Darby Forsythe – Beach Bum (uncredited)
The Angry Red Planet (1959) as CWO Sam Jacobs
The Gazebo (1959) as Taxi Driver (uncredited)
The Last Voyage (1960) as Chief Engineer Pringle
The Apartment (1960) as Dr. Dreyfuss
The Bellboy (1960) as Jack E. Mulcher, President of Paramount Pictures (uncredited)
Studs Lonigan (1960) as Charlie the Greek
Seven Ways from Sundown (1960) as Beeker
Where the Boys Are (1960) as Max – Cafe Counterman (uncredited)
The Ladies Man (1961) as Graduation Emcee Professor
Lover Come Back (1961) as Doctor Linus Tyler
Follow That Dream (1962) as Carmine
Cape Fear (1962) as Attorney Dave Grafton
Convicts 4 (1962) as Resko's Father
McLintock! (1963) as Jake Birnbaum
The Unsinkable Molly Brown (1964) as Christmas Morgan
Dear Brigitte (1965) as Doctor Volker
Harlow (1965) as Louis B. Mayer
The Happening (1967) as Inspector
Caprice (1967) as Matthew Cutter
Istanbul Express (1968 TV movie) as Captain Granicekm
Holly Golightly (1969 TV movie)
The Million Dollar Duck (1971) as Doctor Gottlieb
Deadly Harvest (1972 TV movie)
Freebie and the Bean (1974) as Red Meyers
The Log of the Black Pearl (1975 TV movie)
The Whiz Kid and the Carnival Caper (1976 TV movie)
Guardian of the Wilderness (1976) as Madden
The November Plan (1977 TV movie) 
Satan's Cheerleaders (1977) as Billy
Incredible Rocky Mountain Race (1977 TV movie)
The Time Machine (1978 TV movie)
Once Upon a Starry Night (1978 TV movie) 
Sunburn (1979) as Gela
Cheaters (1980 TV movie)
The Adventures of Huckleberry Finn (1980 TV movie)
Under the Rainbow (1981) as Louie
Legend of the Wild (1981)
Money to Burn (1983) as Pops
Dark Mirror (1984 TV movie)
Deadly Intentions (1985 TV movie)
Penny Ante: The Motion Picture (1990) as Isadore (Izzy) Perlman
The American Clock (1993 TV movie)
Hart to Hart: Home Is Where the Hart Is (1994 TV movie)
'Til There Was You (1997) as Mr. Katz

Partial television credits

Dragnet - 12 episodes (1951-1959)
Terry and the Pirates - episode "Macao Gold" (1952) as Chopstick Joe
Craig Kennedy, Criminologist- "The Big Shakedown" (1952) as Jack Brown
Treasury Men in Action - "Case of the Swindler's Gold" (1955) as Miguel
The Adventures of Jim Bowie - "The Birth of the Blade" (1956) as Louis, and "Jackson's Assassination" (1957) as Frost
Gunsmoke - "Spring Term" (1956) as Jed
Crusader - "A Deal in Diamonds" (1956) as Leon 
Adventures of Superman - "Tomb of Zaharan" (1957) as First Airport Robber
Zorro - "The Man with the Whip" and "The Cross of the Andes" (1958) as Jose Mordante
Trackdown - "The Kid" (1958) as Milo York 
The Rifleman - "One Went to Denver" (1959) as Sammy, "The Retired Gun" (1959) as Clyde Bailey, "Baranca" (1960) as Doc Burrage, "Trail of Hate" (1960) as Doc Burrage
Bat Masterson - "The Inner Circle" (1959) as Patch Finley, "The Desert Ship" (1959) as Ben Tarko 
Wanted: Dead or Alive - "The Empty Cell" (1959) as Hunt Willis, "Railroaded" (1959) as Sheriff Pig Wells
The Rough Riders - "Ransom of Rita Renee" (1959) as Tully
The D.A.'s Man - "Guns for Hire" (1959) as Leo Muller 
Sugarfoot - "The Desperadoes" (1959) as Sam Bolt
The Detectives - "Twelve Hours to Live" (1960) as Fred Hambrough, "Secret Assignment" (1961) as Jonesy 
The Westerner - "Going Home" (1960) as Rigdon
Richard Diamond, Private Detective - "The Lovely Fraud" (1960) as Max Schilling
Death Valley Days - "Eagle in the Rocks" (1960) as Manuel Garcia
Black Saddle - "The Apprentice" (1960) as Ben Winkleman
Rawhide - "Canliss" (1964) as Barkeep
I Spy - "Lisa" (1966) as Aram Kanjarian
The Red Skelton Show - "The Bum Who Came in from the Cold" (1966) as Dr. Shnorba
The John Forsythe Show - "Engagement, Italian Style" (1966) as Constantino 
Batman - "Zelda the Great" (1966) and "A Death Worse Than Fate" (1966) as Eivol Ekdal
Bonanza - "Big Shadow on the Land" (1966), "The Deed and the Dilemma" (1967) and "The Sound of Drums" (1968) as Giorgio Rossi
I Spy - "The Medarra Block" (1967) as Isaac
The Mike Douglas Show (1967) as Himself 
Ironside - "The Macabre Mr. Micawber (1968) as McKay, "Memory of an Ice Cream Stick" (1968) as Busch
Daniel Boone - "Sweet Molly Malone" (1969) as Herman
Hawaii Five-O - "For a Million... Why Not?" (1971) as Blumberg
Emergency! - "The Wedsworth-Townsend Act"  (1972) as State Assemblyman Michael Wolski
The Magician - "Ovation for Murder" (1973) as Albie Allikolos 
Columbo - "The Most Dangerous Match (1973)" as Tomlin Dudek 
Assignment: Vienna - "So Long, Charlie" (1973) as Orloff
McCloud - "Shivaree on Delancy Street" (1974) as Selditz
The Rockford Files - "Gearjammers, Part 2" (1975) as John Koenig
Movin' On - "Living It Up!" (1976) as Mr. Nash
Ellery Queen - "The Adventure of the Judas Tree" (1976) as Gunther Starr
Walt Disney's Wonderful World of Color - "The Whiz Kid and the Carnival Caper: Parts 1 & 2" (1976) as Abner Debney 
The Life and Times of Grizzly Adams - Home of the Hawk (1977) as Metcalf, "Once Upon a Starry Night" (1978) as Frost-bite Foley
Busting Loose - 12 episodes (1977) as Sam Markowitz
Barney Miller - "Burial" (1977) as Julius Wittenour
The Incredible Hulk - "Terror in Times Square" (1978) as Norman Abrams
Trapper John, M.D. - "Deadly Exposure" (1979) as Nicholas Bulgari 
Alice - "Mel, the Magi" (1979) as Santa Claus
Barney Miller - "The DNA Story" (1979) as Rudolph Kamen 
Vega$ - "Vendetta" (1980) as Carlo
Little House on the Prairie - "Gambini the Great" (1981) as Rudolpho 'The Great' Gambini
Trapper John, M.D. - "Cooperative Care" (1981) as Marvin Krakowsky
CHiPs - "Home Fires Burning" (1981) as Frank Higgins
Alice - "Carrie Chickens Out" (1981) as Benny Conway
The Devlin Connection - "Brian and Nick" (1982) as Max Salkall
No Soap, Radio - 5 episodes (1982) as Skit Performer 
Hart to Hart - "Hart and Sole" (1982) as Harry Fulterman 
Barney Miller - "Examination Day" (1982) as Benjamin Diamond
Matt Houston - "The Crying Clown" (1983) as Jonas Van Poolen, "Company Secrets" (1985) as Reels
Zorro and Son - "Zorro and Son" (1983) as Commandante La Brea
The A-Team - "The Out-of-Towners" (1983) as Bernie Shatzman
Hill Street Blues - "Fuched Again" (1984) as Isadore Fagenbaum
Webster - 18 episodes (1984-1989) as 'Papa' Papadapolis
Too Close for Comfort - "Reconcilable Differences" (1985) as Dr. Axel Schreiber
Remington Steele - "Springtime for Steele" (1985) as Buddy Brokaw
Magnum, P.I. - "Laura" (1987) as Doheny's partner and speaker at the retirement
Full House - "Greek Week" (1990) and "The Last Dance" (1994) as Iorgos 'Papouli' Katsopolis
Material World - 8 episodes (1990-1991) as Fred Avery
Matlock - "The Nightmare" (1991) as Judge Ogilvie/Bus Repairman
Murder, She Wrote - "Tainted Lady" (1991) as Dr. John Logan
The Fresh Prince of Bel-Air - "Home Is Where the Heart Attack Is" (1993) as Mr. Melville
Lois & Clark: The New Adventures of Superman - "Madame Ex" (1994) as Captain Keene
Empty Nest - "What's a Mother to Do?" (1994) as Heshy

References

External links

1922 births
2002 deaths
Canadian people of Russian-Jewish descent
Male actors from Winnipeg
Canadian male film actors
Canadian male television actors
Canadian male radio actors
People from Chandler, Arizona
20th-century Canadian male actors
Jewish Canadian male actors
Canadian people of Jewish descent
Canadian expatriate male actors in the United States
United States Army personnel of World War II